The compositions of Orlando Gibbons (1583–1625) include works in virtually every genre of the Elizabethan and Jacobean eras. Due to his sudden and early death, Gibbons' output was not as large as that of his older contemporary William Byrd, but he still managed to produce various secular and sacred polyphonic vocal works, including consort songs, services, more than 40 full anthems and verse anthems, a set of 20 madrigals as well as at least 20 keyboard works and various instrumental ensemble pieces including nearly 30 fantasies for viols. He is well known for the 5-part verse anthem This Is the Record of John, the 8-part full anthem O Clap Your Hands Together, 2 settings of Evensong and what is often thought to be the best known English madrigal: The Silver Swan.

List of compositions

Sacred Vocal works

Services
* Incomplete or lost work

Adaptations

Full Anthems
* Incomplete or lost work

Doubtful Attributions

Verse Anthems
* Incomplete or lost work

Adaptations
Various adaptations of Gibbons' Verse Anthems exist, two of which – O Thou the central orb and Great Lord of Lords – are especially common. Both of these versions were created for Sir Frederick Ouseley's 1873 edition of Gibbons' church music, with new words by Henry Ramsden Bramley.

Doubtful Attributions

Hymne tunes
George Withers' 'Hymnes and Songs of the Church', published 1623, contains 16 works by Gibbons in the original edition and adds a 17th in a later edition. All texts are by George Wither.

Secular Vocal works

The First Set of Madrigals and Motets

Consort songs

Keyboard works

Parthenia

Fantasies

Pavans and Galliards

Other pieces

Instrumental works

Fantasies of Three Parts

Fantasies of Three Parts dedicated to Edward Wraye.

Viol fantasias of two parts

Viol fantasias with double bass

Viol fantasias of six parts

* Incomplete or lost work

Viol In Nomines

Other pieces for viols

Notes

References

Sources

External links
 Free scores by Orlando Gibbons at the International Music Score Library Project (IMSLP)
 List of Works by Orlando Gibbons on Grove Music 
 Index from Stainer & Bell of vocal works by Gibbons

Anthems
Christian songs
Compositions by Orlando Gibbons
Gibbons, Orlando